Cape La Croix Creek is a stream in Cape Girardeau County in the U.S. state of Missouri. It is a tributary of the Mississippi River.

In 1699, Fathers Montigny, Davion and St. Cosme, French missionaries, erected a cross where this stream entered the Mississippi and prayed that this might be the beginning of Christianity among the Indians. The stream has ever since been known as Cape La Croix Creek. Cape La Croix is a rock island in the Mississippi River where the cross was erected.

See also
List of rivers of Missouri

References

Rivers of Cape Girardeau County, Missouri
Rivers of Missouri